Adenosylcobinamide-GDP ribazoletransferase (CobS, cobalamin synthase, cobalamin-5'-phosphate synthase, cobalamin (5'-phosphate) synthase) is an enzyme with systematic name adenosylcobinamide-GDP:alpha-ribazole ribazoletransferase. This enzyme catalyses the following chemical reaction

 (1) adenosylcobinamide-GDP + alpha-ribazole  GMP + adenosylcobalamin
 (2)  adenosylcobinamide-GDP + alpha-ribazole 5'-phosphate  GMP + adenosylcobalamin 5'-phosphate

This enzyme is part of the biosynthetic pathway to cobalamin (vitamin B12) in bacteria.

See also
 Cobalamin biosynthesis

References

External links 
 

EC 2.7.8